The 2012–13 Arkansas–Little Rock Trojans men's basketball team represented the University of Arkansas at Little Rock during the 2012–13 NCAA Division I men's basketball season. The Trojans, led by tenth year head coach Steve Shields, played their home games at the Jack Stephens Center, and were members of the West Division of the Sun Belt Conference. They finished the season 17–15, 11–9 in Sun Belt play to finish in second place in the West Division. They lost in the quarterfinals of the Sun Belt tournament to FIU. Despite the 17 wins and winning record, they did not participate in a post season tournament.

Roster

Schedule
 
|-
!colspan=9| Regular season

|-
!colspan=9| 2013 Sun Belt tournament

References

Arkansas-Little Rock
Little Rock Trojans men's basketball seasons
TRoj
TRoj